Very British Problems is a British television series shown on Channel 4. The first series began on 13 August 2015. A Christmas episode was shown on 17 December 2015. The second series began on 9 May 2016.

The show is based on the Twitter account VeryBritishProblems (@SoVeryBritish) by Rob Temple and the book of the same name.

References

External links 

2015 British television series debuts
Channel 4 original programming
English-language television shows
Television shows based on books